Carlos Narciso Chaínho (born 10 July 1974 in Luanda, Portuguese Angola) is a Portuguese retired footballer who played as a defensive midfielder.

Club career
After having played for modest clubs in the Lisbon area while growing up, Chaínho started playing professionally with C.F. Estrela da Amadora, moving in 1998 to the Primeira Liga with FC Porto. His best season at the latter side was in 1999–2000 when he started in 25 of the 28 league matches he appeared in and scored twice, but they lost the championship to Sporting Clube de Portugal.

In 2001, Chaínho had his first overseas experience, playing in Spain with Real Zaragoza and travelling to Greece the next season to work with Fernando Santos (a coach he knew well from his Estrla da Amadora and Porto days) at Panathinaikos FC. After a very poor season overall – the team failed to win any silverware and he only appeared six times in the Superleague – he returned to Portugal in 2003, playing four years in Madeira, two with C.S. Marítimo and two more with C.D. Nacional; the latter released him in July 2007, and the 33-year-old subsequently signed for Alki Larnaca FC of Cyprus.

After one season in Larnaca, Chaínho spent the first half of the 2008–09 campaign as a free agent, signing in February 2009 with Iran's Shahin Bushehr FC. He retired in the summer, having amassed Portuguese top flight totals of 299 games and 14 goals.

International career
Chaínho appeared for Portugal at under-21 level. In 2006, he received a call-up from the Angola national team, but FIFA confirmed that he was not eligible to represent countries other than the former, due to the regulation at that time.

Honours
Porto
Primeira Liga: 1998–99
Taça de Portugal: 1999–2000, 2000–01
Supertaça Cândido de Oliveira: 1998, 1999; Runner-up 2000

References

External links

1974 births
Living people
Portuguese sportspeople of Angolan descent
Footballers from Luanda
Angolan footballers
Portuguese footballers
Association football midfielders
Primeira Liga players
Casa Pia A.C. players
C.F. Estrela da Amadora players
FC Porto players
C.S. Marítimo players
C.D. Nacional players
La Liga players
Real Zaragoza players
Super League Greece players
Panathinaikos F.C. players
Cypriot First Division players
Alki Larnaca FC players
Shahin Bushehr F.C. players
Portugal under-21 international footballers
Angolan expatriate footballers
Portuguese expatriate footballers
Expatriate footballers in Spain
Expatriate footballers in Greece
Expatriate footballers in Cyprus
Expatriate footballers in Iran
Portuguese expatriate sportspeople in Greece
Portuguese expatriate sportspeople in Cyprus
Portuguese expatriate sportspeople in Iran